Within the field of neurotechnology, Neurofeedback (NFB), also called neurotherapy, neurobiofeedback or EEG biofeedback (EEGBF) is a therapy technique which presents the user with real-time information about activity within their brain, as measured by electrical or blood-flow sensors on the scalp.

Brain activity is monitored and processed to provide feedback to the user in one of several ways, for example a video game rocket ship might accelerate when desired brainwaves are produced (positive feedback), or a film or music might pause when undesired brainwaves are produced (negative feedback). The user then uses this feedback to develop the brainwaves they wish to create and as a consequence, learn to gain more control over their brainwaves and therefore how they think and feel in every day situations. Neurofeedback has been used to help a range of conditions including ADHD and addictions.

General

See also 
 Neurofeedback
 Brainwave synchronization

Brain–computer interfacing
Neuroscience software
Neurotechnology
neurofeedback software